The Simple English Wikipedia is a modified English-language edition of Wikipedia, a free online encyclopedia, written primarily in Basic English and Learning English. It is one of seven Wikipedias written in an Anglic language or English-based pidgin or creole. The site has the stated aim of providing an encyclopedia for "people with different needs, such as students, children, adults with learning difficulties, and people who are trying to learn English." Simple English Wikipedia's basic presentation style makes it helpful for beginners learning English. Its simpler word structure and syntax, while detracting from the standpoint of the raw information, can make the information easier to understand when compared with the regular English Wikipedia.

History 
Simple English Wikipedia was launched on September 18, 2001.

Material from the Simple English Wikipedia formed the basis for One Encyclopedia per Child, a project in One Laptop per Child that ended in 2014.

In 2018, some people wanted to close the site because "there is no proof that the project is reaching its target audience". It was discussed and over 100 editors voted. The decision was made to keep it because the contributor community was "active and robust".

It has more than  registered users, of whom  have made an edit in the past month.

Website structure 

The articles on the Simple English Wikipedia are usually shorter than their English Wikipedia counterparts, typically presenting only basic information. Tim Dowling of The Guardian newspaper explained that "the Simple English version tends to stick to commonly accepted facts". The interface is also more simply labeled; for instance, the "Random article" link on the English Wikipedia is replaced with a "Show any page" link; users are invited to "change" rather than "edit" pages; clicking on a red link shows a "page not created" message rather than the usual "page does not exist". The project encourages, but does not enforce, use of a vocabulary of around 1,500 common English words that is based on Basic English, an 850-word controlled natural language created by Charles Kay Ogden in the 1920s.

See also  
Plain English
Readability

References

External links 

Simple English Wikipedia main page

Wikipedias in Germanic languages